DMDM hydantoin is an antimicrobial formaldehyde releaser preservative with the trade name Glydant. DMDM hydantoin is an organic compound belonging to a class of compounds known as hydantoins. It is used in the cosmetics industry and found in products like shampoos, hair conditioners, hair gels, and skin care products.

DMDM hydantoin slowly releases formaldehyde and works as a preservative by making the environment less favorable to microorganisms.

Safety
A patch test study found that "an increase in the use of DMDM hydantoin in cosmetic products will also inevitably increase the risk of cosmetic dermatitis in consumers allergic to formaldehyde." 

The safety of formaldehyde is a topic of ongoing concern, given the prevalence of formaldehyde and formaldehyde releasers in industrial uses. Formaldehyde is considered "an important metabolic product in plants and animals (including humans), where it occurs in low but measurable concentrations." However, long-term exposure to formaldehyde (particularly routine inhalation of its fumes) is thought to cause irritation of the eyes and mucous membranes, headaches, shortness of breath, and aggravation of asthma symptoms. It was declared a "toxic product" by the 1999 Canadian Environmental Protection Act, and the US National Toxicology Program officially classed formaldehyde as "known to be a human carcinogen in June 2011. 

In the EU, the maximum allowed concentration of formaldehyde in finished products is 0.2%, and any product that exceeds 0.05% has to include a warning that the product contains formaldehyde.

References 

Hydantoins
Cosmetics chemicals
Preservatives